The  is Japanese aerial lift line in Haruna, Gunma, operated by Tanigawadake Ropeway Company. The Tōbu Group company also operates another aerial lift line, Tanigawadake Ropeway. The line climbs to the summit of Mount Haruna. The line opened in 1929, and refurbished in 1996 to the current system, which two smaller cabins are attached.

Basic data
Cable length: 
Vertical interval:

See also
List of aerial lifts in Japan

External links
 Official website

 

Gondola lifts in Japan
Aerial tramways in Japan
1929 establishments in Japan